LMI may refer to:

 Lenders mortgage insurance
 Low and moderate income; see Transit-oriented development
 Logistics Management Institute, a consultancy dedicated to improving the business of government
 Liberty Media International, a media-company in the United States of America
 Linear matrix inequality
 Linux Mark Institute
 Lisp Machines, Inc.
 Lista Monumentelor Istorice, the National Register of Historic Monuments in Romania
 Liverpool Medical Institution
 Local Management Interface, a frame-relay term
 Log management and intelligence, in computer systems management
 Logistics Management Institute, a U.S. management consulting firm in Tyson's Corner, Virginia
 LaMia (ICAO airline code: LMI), former Bolivian charter airline
 Leo Minor (IAU: LMi), a constellation in the northern celestial hemisphere
 Logic Masters India, the Indian representative of the World Puzzle Federation